"Free Money" is a rock song written by Patti Smith and Lenny Kaye, and first released on Smith's 1975 album Horses. In 1977 Sammy Hagar covered the song on his eponymous album. Also covered by Penetration on their album Moving Targets and later by Cell as a B-side.

Notes 

1975 songs
Patti Smith songs
Songs written by Patti Smith
Songs written by Lenny Kaye
Song recordings produced by John Cale